Hopwood-Miller Tavern is a historic home that also served as an inn and tavern located in the village of Hopwood, South Union Township, Fayette County, Pennsylvania.  It was built about 1816, and is a -story, 5-bay, stone building with a center hall floor plan in a vernacular Federal style. It has a -story, rear kitchen ell. Also on the property is a stone spring house. It served as a stop for 19th-century travelers on the National Road.

It was added to the National Register of Historic Places in 1995.

References

Houses on the National Register of Historic Places in Pennsylvania
Houses completed in 1816
Federal architecture in Pennsylvania
Houses in Fayette County, Pennsylvania
1816 establishments in Pennsylvania
National Register of Historic Places in Fayette County, Pennsylvania